Crawford Mystery Theatre (originally broadcast on NBC as Public Prosecutor before being dropped by NBC, then picked up by DuMont) is an American television program broadcast on the DuMont Television Network Thursdays at 9:30pm ET beginning on September 6, 1951. The series was also seen in first-run syndication. The series ran from 1951 to 1952.

Broadcast history
Originally filmed in 1947-48 by Jerry Fairbanks Productions and titled Public Prosecutor, the program starred John Howard, Walter Sande, and Anne Gwynne in a typical murder-mystery setting. The show originally aired on NBC.

The series is most notable for being television's first filmed series (although not the first filmed series broadcast), paving the way for later filmed TV series such as I Love Lucy four years later.

After running in syndication earlier that year as Public Prosecutor, the program aired on DuMont from 6 September 1951 to 27 September 1951. Re-titled Crawford Mystery Theatre, after sponsor Crawford Clothes, the series was padded out to thirty minutes with the addition of a panel show segment. Before the guilty party was revealed, three studio panelists would attempt to guess his or her identity. This version of the show was hosted by Warren Hull.

After the network cancellation, the program continued to air locally on DuMont's flagship station, WABD in New York City. The final program aired on February 28, 1952.

Episode status
An episode of Crawford Mystery Theatre survives at the Museum of Broadcast Communications in Chicago. Internet Archive has two episodes, "The Case of the Comic-Strip Murder" (September 20, 1951) and "The Case of the Man Who Wasn't There" (January 17, 1952). Public Prosecutor has over 20 surviving episodes.

See also
List of programs broadcast by the DuMont Television Network
List of surviving DuMont Television Network broadcasts
1951-52 United States network television schedule

References

Bibliography
David Weinstein, The Forgotten Network: DuMont and the Birth of American Television (Philadelphia: Temple University Press, 2004) 
Alex McNeil, Total Television, Fourth edition (New York: Penguin Books, 1980) 
Tim Brooks and Earle Marsh, The Complete Directory to Prime Time Network TV Shows, Third edition (New York: Ballantine Books, 1964)

External links

List of episodes at CTVA
DuMont historical website
"The Case of the Comic-Strip Murder" (aired September 20, 1951) at Internet Archive
"The Case of the Man Who Wasn't There" (aired January 17, 1952) at Internet Archive

DuMont Television Network original programming
1950s American television series
Black-and-white American television shows
1951 American television series debuts
1952 American television series endings